BQ-788 is a selective ETB antagonist.

See also
 Endothelin

References

Piperidines
Organic sodium salts
Tryptamines
Carbamates
Peptides